Okey Isima (24 August 1956 – 18 February 2013) was a Nigerian football defender who played for Nigeria in the 1980 Summer Olympics and in the 1980 African Cup of Nations.

Personal life
The seventh of ten children, Isima and his wife lived in Atlanta and had four children.

External links
Sport Reference Profile

References

1956 births
2013 deaths
Sportspeople from Kano
Africa Cup of Nations-winning players
Nigerian footballers
Nigeria international footballers
1980 African Cup of Nations players
Footballers at the 1980 Summer Olympics
Olympic footballers of Nigeria
Nigerian expatriate footballers
Nigerian expatriate sportspeople in Portugal
Expatriate footballers in Portugal
Association football defenders
Vitória S.C. players